John Moffitt or John Moffit may refer to:
 John Moffitt (long jumper) (born 1980), U.S. long jumper
 John Moffitt (American football) (born 1986), American football offensive lineman
 John Moffitt (director), U.S. television director
 John H. Moffitt (1843–1926), U.S politician and war veteran
 John A. Moffit, co-founder of the United Hatters of North America

See also
 John Moffatt (disambiguation)
 John Moffett (disambiguation)